Ejlif Egon Richard Søndergaard Krogager (5 February 1910 – 7 January 1992) was a Danish pastor and entrepreneur, who founded Nordisk Bustrafik in 1951.

During the Second World War he was active in the Danish resistance movement.

After the war he entered the tourism business by founding Nordisk Bustrafik in 1951, offering affordable bus trips for Danish tourists. The business developed into Tjæreborg Rejser, which started a German subsidiary in 1973, becoming the fourth largest travel agency in that country within 3 years. In 1962 he and Jørgen Størling founded Sterling Airways, which offered charter flights from Billund.

In 1968 Sterling Airways was bought out of Tjæreborg Group. Tjæreborg Rejser was sold to Janni Spies, owner of another Danish travel agency, on 3 January 1989. The German subsidiary had already been sold eight years before.

External links
 Ejlif's tombstone at gravsted.dk

1910 births
1992 deaths
20th-century Danish businesspeople